Jane Metcalfe is the co-founder, with Louis Rossetto, and former president of Wired Ventures, creator and original publisher of the magazine Wired. Prior to that, Metcalfe managed advertising sales for the Amsterdam-based Electric Word magazine. She and Rossetto co-founded TCHO chocolates. Metcalfe is life-partners with Rossetto and they have two children.

Career
In 1994 Metcalfe was elected to the board of the Electronic Frontier Foundation.

Metcalfe was on the 2004 and 2005 Digital Communities jury of Prix Ars Electronica.

In 2015 Metcalfe and Rossetto were awarded the Lifetime Achievement Award at The 19th Annual Webby Awards.

Metcalfe and Rossetto co-founded Tcho Chocolate, a Berkeley, Calif.-based maker and vendor of artisanal chocolates.. In early 2018, Tcho was sold to the Japanese firm Ezaki Glico (maker of Pocky).

Metcalfe in 2017 founded NEO.LIFE, a web-based and email magazine, that focuses on the people, companies, and biological technologies that are improving, repairing, and extending life.

Metcalfe is a partner, along with Rossetto, in Força da Imaginaçao, an independent investment concern with interests in technology, media, and real estate. She is also a board member at One Economy Corporation, which maximizes the potential of technology to help low-income people improve their lives and join the economic mainstream. She was a founding board member of Ex'pression College for Digital Arts as well as the ZER01: The Art and Technology Network.

Metcalfe is vice president of the board of trustees of the UC Berkeley Art Museum and Pacific Film Archive.

She has been a board member of the Focused Ultrasound Foundation since 2020. 

She is a frequent speaker and presenter at various events and institutions, from UC Berkeley, MIT, Stanford and Singularity University to ComicCon, De Young Museum, StartUp Health, Health 2.0, Wired Health, TEDx San Francisco, TEDx Carnegie Mellon, Hello Tomorrow, Wanderlust Festival, etc.

References

External links

 ZER01: The Art and Technology Network
 Ex'pression College of Digital Arts 
NEO.LIFE

Living people
Louisville Collegiate School alumni
University of Colorado Boulder alumni
Wired (magazine) people
1961 births
Businesspeople from Louisville, Kentucky